Louis D. Greenwald (born March 11, 1967) is an American Democratic Party politician, who has represented the 6th Legislative District in the New Jersey General Assembly since taking office on January 9, 1996. He has served as the Assembly Majority Leader since January 10, 2012.

Early life 
Raised in Cherry Hill, New Jersey, Greenwald graduated from Cherry Hill High School East, earned a B.A. in 1989 from Moravian College in political science and was awarded a J.D. in 1992 from the Seton Hall University School of Law. Greenwald is the son of the late Maria Barnaby Greenwald, a former Mayor of Cherry Hill Township and a former Camden County Freeholder Director and Surrogate. He lives in Voorhees Township with his wife Cynthia and three children - Lauren, Eric, and Jenna.

New Jersey Assembly 
Greenwald was the Assembly's Budget Committee Chair from 2002 to 2012 and was the Assistant Minority Leader from 1998 to 1999. Assemblyman Greenwald is a member of the Camden County Bar Association, the Camden County Democratic Committee and the Camden County Traffic Safety Task Force Committees. He was a member of the CEO/Executive Advisory Board for the Southern New Jersey Council Boy Scouts of America.

Committees 
Committee assignments for the current session are:
None

District 6 
Each of the 40 districts in the New Jersey Legislature has one representative in the New Jersey Senate and two members in the New Jersey General Assembly. Representatives from the 6th District for the 2022—2023 Legislative Session are:
Senator James Beach (D)
Assemblyman Louis Greenwald (D)
Assemblywoman Pamela Rosen Lampitt (D)

Electoral history

Assembly

References

External links 
Assemblyman Greenwald's legislative web page, New Jersey Legislature
New Jersey Legislature financial disclosure forms
2016 2015 2014 2013 2012 2011 2010 2009 2008 2007 2006 2005 2004
Lou Greenwald website
Assembly Member Louis D. Greenwald, Project Vote Smart

|-

1967 births
Cherry Hill High School East alumni
21st-century American politicians
Living people
Moravian University alumni
Democratic Party members of the New Jersey General Assembly
New Jersey lawyers
Politicians from Cherry Hill, New Jersey
People from Mount Holly, New Jersey
People from Voorhees Township, New Jersey
Seton Hall University School of Law alumni